Snowmine is an American indie pop band from Brooklyn, New York.

History
Snowmine was formed in 2010. They self-released their debut studio album in 2011 titled Laminate Pet Animal. They released their second full-length album in 2014 on Mystery Buildings titled Dialects.

Band members

Grayson Sanders (lead vocals, keys)
Jay Goodman (bass) 
Alex Beckmann (drums)
Austin Mendenhall (guitar)
Calvin Pia (guitar, keys, backing vocals)

Discography
Studio albums
Laminate Pet Animal (2011, self-released)
Dialects (2014, Mystery Buildings)

References

Indie pop groups from New York (state)
Musical groups from Brooklyn